La valigia dei sogni ("Suitcase of dreams") is a 1953 Italian comedy film directed by Luigi Comencini.

Cast
 Umberto Melnati: Ettore Omeri
 Maria-Pia Casilio: Mariannina
 Roberto Risso: Giorgio Astori
 Ludmilla Dudarova: Baronessa Caprioli
 Helena Makowska as herself
 Giulio Calì: Impiegato della Biblioteca Nazionale
 Xenia Valderi: Direttrice del museo
 Giuseppe Chinnici: Commissario
 Nino Vingelli: Detenuto
 Pietro De Vico: Director

References

External links
 

1953 comedy films
1953 films
Italian comedy films
Films directed by Luigi Comencini
Films about actors
Films scored by Mario Nascimbene
Italian black-and-white films
1950s Italian-language films
1950s Italian films